Judi Wangalwa Wakhungu is a Kenyan politician and diplomat who was appointed by President Uhuru Kenyatta as ambassador to France on 26 January 2018. Immediately prior to her present position, she served as the cabinet secretary for environment and regional development authorities from 25 April 2013 until 17 January 2018.

Background and education
Professor Judi Wakhungu is the daughter of Grace and the Late Mathew Wakhungu. She received a Bachelor of Science degree in geology from St. Lawrence University in New York in 1983. She also holds a Master of Science degree in petroleum geology from Acadia University in Nova Scotia, Canada, awarded in 1986. Her Doctor of Philosophy degree in energy resources management from was obtained from Pennsylvania State University in 1993.

Career before politics
Wakhungu was the first woman hired as a geologist in the Ministry of Energy and Regional Development, where her duties entailed exploring for geothermal energy in Kenya’s Rift Valley. She was also the first female petroleum geologist to serve in the National Oil Corporation of Kenya. She was also the first woman faculty member at the Department of Geology at the University of Nairobi.

Prior to joining the Kenya cabinet in 2013, Wakhungu was the executive director of the African Center for Technology Studies (ACTS) in Nairobi, Kenya. She has been an associate professor of science, technology, and society at Pennsylvania State University, where she also served as the director of the Women in the Sciences and Engineering (WISE) Institute. She has also served as an energy advisor to the Energy Sector Management Program of the World Bank and advisor at the Legatum Centre at the Massachusetts Institute of Technology. She also serves as a member of the scientific advisory board of the UN Secretary-General.

Political career
She is credited with the ban on the manufacture, importation and distribution of plastic bags in Kenya, by the National Environment Management Authority (NEMA) and the Kenya Ministry of the Environment, while she was the cabinet secretary for the Environment.

Other considerations
She is a "designated energy expert" for the Gender Working Group of the United Nations Commission of Science and Technology for Development. She has also served as the executive director of the African Technology Policy Studies (ATPS).

She has served on many boards and committees, both nationally and internationally. She was the research director of the Global Energy Policy and Planning Program of the International Federation of Institutes for Advanced Study (IFIAS), which is based in Toronto, Canada. She has also served as the project leader of the Renewable Energy Technology Dissemination Project of the Stockholm Environment Institute (SEI). Her research interests include energy resources management, materials, energy policy and development, science, technology, and development; and gender issues in science and technology policy.

See also
Amina Mohamed
Raychelle Omamo

References

External links
Profile of Professor Judy Wakhungu

Living people
Kenyan diplomats
Kenyan politicians
St. Lawrence University alumni
Acadia University alumni
Pennsylvania State University alumni
Kenyan women diplomats
People from Bungoma County
21st-century Kenyan women politicians
21st-century Kenyan politicians
Academic staff of the University of Nairobi
Pennsylvania State University faculty
Year of birth missing (living people)
Kenyan geologists
Kenyan women geologists
Ambassadors of Kenya to France
Women ambassadors